The Spoilers were a Southern California punk rock/new wave band formed in 1978.

History
The Spoilers began in Los Angeles, California in 1978. The founding members were Chris Hickey,  George Padgett and Dean Stefan. Bill Hickey was also considered a semi-member of the band when he was not attending law school at Berkeley. Their first EP was released in 1978 on White Lunch Records and contained the songs "Has Been" (written by Dean Stefan), "Battling On" (Chris Hickey), "Boys Night Out" (Dean Stefan) and "The Ugly Nancies" (Chris Hickey). Hickey and Stefan were credited with guitar and Padgett with bass.

Under the management of local impresario Stan Bernstein, the band moved from a punk to a new wave band, to fit their image as soft clean-cut suburbanites. Bernstein released a second Spoilers record in 1979, Balloon Water Race, that contained "Focus" (Dean Stefan), "Loose Words" (Chris Hickey), "Mr. X" (Craig Wisda) and "Point Blank" (Bruce Springsteen). A 45 single followed in 1980 on White Lunch Records, of Stefan's "Greta", backed with Hickey's "Loose Words". The single was played by Rodney Bingenheimer on the KROQ as well as on Dr Demento's syndicated show.

The band then relocated south to Los Angeles. A five-song mini album was recorded with Paul Wexler, but was not released due to contractual disagreement with Wexler. Instead, the band left to record a 1980 single on Elton John’s record label, The Rocket Record Company. This single featured Stefan’s "Reckless" backed by a new version of "Battling On".

Kessler and Wisda left the band in 1981. Hickey and Stefan then recorded a 12-song album, produced by Steve Verroca, and using studio musicians.

Later solo work
Chris Hickey went on to release six solo albums, co-lead the alt-folk band Show of Hands with future Beach Boy Randell Kirsch, and lead the alternative band Uma. Both bands released CDs on major labels (I.R.S. Records and MCA Universal, respectively). Dean Stefan released a solo album Trial and Error and wrote much of the soundtrack music to the children's television series, Rainbow Fish. These songs were released as a CD on Sony Music.

External links 
Chris Hickey

Punk rock groups from California
Musical groups established in 1978
Musical groups from Los Angeles